The 2000 FIBA Africa Under-18 Championship for Women was the 12th FIBA Africa Under-18 Championship, played under the rules of FIBA, the world governing body for basketball, and the FIBA Africa thereof. The tournament was hosted by Guinea from July 9 to 15, 2000.

Guinea ended the double round-robin tournament with a 5–1 record to win their first title.

Participating teams

Squads

Schedule

Final standings

Awards

See also
 2001 FIBA Africa Championship

External links
Official Website

References

2000 in African basketball
Bask
FIBA Africa Under-18 Championship